BEAT is a citrus-flavored soft drink by The Coca-Cola Company released in Mexico in 2002. It was a Mexican version of citrus soft drinks like Mello Yello or Surge and a response to the release in Mexico of Mountain Dew by PepsiCo. Beat was discontinued in 2005. In 2009, it was re-launched in South Africa.

Coca-Cola brands